The Hay River Highway, officially Northwest Territories Highway 2, is the shortest numbered highway in the Northwest Territories and connects Hay River to the junction of Highway 1 at Enterprise.

The highway was originally a portion of the Mackenzie Highway; this status ended with the extension of the highway northwest from Enterprise, first as a route around Great Slave Lake to Yellowknife, and then west to Fort Simpson.

The highway is one of the most "ruralized" highways in the N.W.T., with two subdivisions and one or two other clusters of homes.

The highway is designated as a core route of Canada's National Highway System.

Northwest Territories territorial highways